The Ohio Society of New York is an historical, social, and patriotic organization established in 1885 and based in New York City. It is the oldest state society in New York.

History
The Ohio Society of New York was founded by Civil War General Thomas Ewing Jr., when he and several other prominent gentlemen of Ohio roots living in New York City met on November 10, 1885, and made the first entry into the society's first minute book. They met 10 days later, on November 20, 1885, and adopted a constitution.

Initially a dining society, the group later leased private rooms at the Waldorf Astoria (then located on Fifth Avenue and 33rd Street) until 1929, the Hotel Pennsylvania until 1962, and the Biltmore until 1977.

The society is perhaps best known for its extravagant annual banquets which, during the 1800s and 1900s, were often oversubscribed and frequently reported on by the media. It continues to hold meetings and events today.

Membership
Candidates must be invited to join by a member who will act as proposer and facilitate the introduction of another member willing to second the nomination. Candidates must then meet with and be approved by the board of governors. Eligibility may be established by Ohio ancestral lineage, residence, or education. The Governor of Ohio and Bishop of Ohio are customarily admitted to membership.

Notable members

Public officials
 William B. Allison, U.S. Senator
 Calvin S. Brice, U.S. Senator (founding member)
 William C. Cooper, U.S. Representative
 James M. Cox, Governor of Ohio
 Martin L. Davey, Governor of Ohio
 Stephen B. Elkins, U.S. Secretary of War
 Charles Foster, Governor of Ohio, U.S. Secretary of the Treasury
 George W. Geddes, U.S. Representative
 Newton Gilbert, Lt. Governor of Indiana
 Mark Hanna, U.S. Senator
 Warren G. Harding, 29th President of the United States
 Judson Harmon, Governor of Ohio
 John Hay, U.S. Secretary of State, U.S. Ambassador to the Court of St. James's (honorary member)
 Rutherford B. Hayes, 19th President of the United States (honorary member)
 Myron T. Herrick, Governor of Ohio
 Charles D. Hilles, Private Secretary to President William H. Taft
 Hugh Judge Jewett, U.S. Representative
 John P. Jones, U.S. Senator
 Stanley Matthews, U.S. Supreme Court Justice
 Henry B. Payne, U.S. Senator
 Preston B. Plumb, U.S. Senator
 Ogden Reid, U.S. Representative
 Whitelaw Reid, U.S. Ambassador to the Court of St. James's
 Milton Sayler, U.S. Representative
 John Sherman, U.S. Senator, U.S. Secretary of State, U.S. Secretary of the Treasury
 William Henry Smith, Ohio Secretary of State
 Milton I. Southard, U.S. Representative (founding member)
 William L. Strong, mayor of New York City (founding member)
 William Howard Taft, 27th President of the United States (honorary member)
 Robert A. Taft Jr., U.S. Senator, U.S. Representative
 William H. Upson, U.S. Supreme Court Justice
 Morrison R. Waite, Chief Justice, U.S. Supreme Court
 George White, Governor of Ohio

Army and naval officers
 General Thomas Ewing Jr. (founding member)
 General Philip H. Sheridan (honorary member)
 General William T. Sherman (honorary member)
 Major General Wager Swayne
 Brigadier General George King Hunter
 Brigadier General Chase Wilmot Kennedy
 Brigadier General Julius Augustus Penn
 Brevet Brigadier General Anson G. McCook (founding member)
 Brevet Brigadier General Henry Lawrence Burnett (founding member)
 Brevet Brigadier General Thomas T. Eckert, Assistant Secretary of War
 Commodore Harold Eldridge
 Captain Calvin E. Coulter
 Captain John C. Leonard
 Colonel John L. Bond
 Colonel Berkeley Enochs
 Colonel Wm. Perry Fogg (founding member)
 Colonel Henry O. S. Heistand
 Colonel Benson W. Hough
 Colonel John James McCook
 Colonel C. W. Moulton (founding member)
 Colonel James W. Van Dusen
 Colonel Charles C. Walcutt Jr.
 Commander Frank T. Watrous
 Lieutenant Colonel Chauncey B. Baker
 Lieutenant Colonel Richard T. Ellis
 Major Ephraim C. Dawes

Other notable members
 Paul D. Cravath, founding partner of Cravath, Swain & Moore
 Thomas Edison (honorary member)
 Harvey S. Firestone
 B.F. Goodrich
 Augustus D. Juilliard
 John D. Rockefeller
 Algernon S. Sullivan, founding partner of Sullivan & Cromwell

References

External links

1885 establishments in New York (state)